Emmanuel Kofi Botwe , known by his stage name Kwaw Kese and popularly called Abodam (craziness), is a Ghanaian hiplife artist. Kwaw Kese is well known for his hit album Abodam 2007, for which he won five awards at the 2008 edition of the Ghana Music Awards. He is known for doing crazy- like acts during his performance on stage.

Early life and education
He was born in Agona Swedru in the Central Region of Ghana. He is an alumnus of Happy Home Junior Secondary School and Winneba Secondary School. He began composing and performing his songs from the age of 14. After his high school education, he worked as a meter reader for the Electricity Company of Ghana for three years. He did not have much interest for that job so he decided to take his music more seriously. He left for Accra and in 2004, he met Hammer of The Last Two and was signed to the record label.

Record label and solo career 
He launched the record label Mad-Time Entertainment in 2005. He released his debut solo album which he titled 'Na Ya Tal'. His second album Abodam 07 was released under his label.

Cannabis smoking 
In December 2014, Kwaw Kese was arrested by the Ghana Police Service in Kumasi for smoking cannabis in public, which he didn't deny. He has since been put to court and tried. On 23 April 2015, he was sentenced to one day in jail after being found guilty of smoking cannabis and made to pay gh¢1200 as fine.

Awards

Ghana Music Awards

Singles

Videography

References 

http://www.myjoyonline.com/entertainment/2015/April-23rd/kwaw-kese-sentenced-to-1-day-imprisonment-fined-ghc1-200.php

Living people
Ghanaian rappers
21st-century Ghanaian male singers
21st-century Ghanaian singers
People from Central Region (Ghana)
Year of birth missing (living people)